O, Majestic Winter, also stylized as O' Majestic Winter, is an experimental black metal project that originated out of Lewisburg, Tennessee, United States in the year 2008. The project was formed by Max Tubville and Corey Leverette, both of whom had performed in a hardcore punk band called Seventimesfallen prior to forming the band. The band has released four studio albums, two through Sullen Records and the third through Sanctus Gladius Records.

History
O, Majestic Winter was formed in October 2008 by Max Tubville and Corey Leverette, who had previously worked together in Seventimesfallen, a Christian hardcore band they had formed during high school. The two initially went under the aliases of "Morgemil the Dark Slayer" and "Gorlim the Dead", but eventually shortened them to simply "Morgemil" and "Gorlim".

On November 10, 2008, it was announced that the band had signed to Sullen Records, home to bands such as Elgibbor, Frost Like Ashes, Hortor, and Broken Flesh. On March 12, 2009, the band released their debut album, Defiling the Serpent's Temple through Sullen Records. The album was described to have mixed elements of black metal, noise music, grindcore, and hardcore punk. Later that year, on September 17, 2009, the band released their second album, An Autumn Moon through the same label. Once the band released the two albums through Sullen, they departed from the label and signed with Sanctus Gladius Records, home to Forfeit Thee Untrue, Diamoth, and Agonal. The band's third album, Eternal Shores: A Spiritual Odyssey, was set to be released in 2013, but due to unknown circumstances, this did not occur. The album's release date was pushed back to April 9, 2015, when it was released through Sanctus Gladius. In 2017, the band would be featured on a compilation titled Hymns of the Blackest Light, Volume 1, which featured bands such as Vials of Wrath, Orationem, Corpse, and Timōrātus. On January 7, 2019, the band thanked their fans and stated they needed to "stay tuned in 2019", hinting at potential new music.

Members
 Max "Morgemil the Dark Slayer" Tubville – vocals, guitars, bass, keyboards (2008–present) (formerly of Abated Mass of Flesh)
 Corey "Gorlim the Dead" Leverette – vocals, guitars, keyboards, drums (2008–present)

Discography
Studio albums
Defiling the Serpent's Temple (March 12, 2009; Sullen Records)
An Autumn Moon (September 17, 2009; Sullen Records)
Eternal Shores: A Spiritual Odyssey (April 9, 2015; Sanctus Gladius Records)
Gloaming (April 7, 2021; independent)

References

External links
Bandcamp

American Christian metal musical groups
American black metal musical groups
Musical groups established in 2008
Musical groups from Tennessee